Mark Wood (September 22, 1839 – July 11, 1866) was an American soldier who fought in the American Civil War. Wood received his country's highest award for bravery during combat, the Medal of Honor, for his role in the celebrated Great Locomotive Chase. Wood and a fellow participant in the raid, John A. Wilson, were captured close to Union lines in Stevenson, Alabama after they abandoned The General. Wood and Wilson escaped from captivity and after sailing down the Chattahoochee River, were rescued by a Union ship. He was honored with the award on May 12, 1865.

Wood joined the Army from Portage, Ohio in August 1861. He was captured a second time at the Battle of Chickamauga, but paroled several days later. He was commissioned as a Second Lieutenant in March 1864, and discharged due to disability the following November. Wood was buried in Toledo, Ohio.

Medal of Honor citation

See also
Great Locomotive Chase
List of Andrews Raiders
List of American Civil War Medal of Honor recipients: T–Z

References

External links
 

1839 births
1866 deaths
American Civil War prisoners of war
American Civil War recipients of the Medal of Honor
English emigrants to the United States
English-born Medal of Honor recipients
People of Ohio in the American Civil War
Union Army soldiers
United States Army Medal of Honor recipients
Great Locomotive Chase